Paul McDonald is a Laois footballer who won an All-Ireland Minor Football Championship medal in 1997 and a Leinster Senior Football Championship medal in 2003.

McDonald plays for the Arles–Killeen club with whom he has won 3 Laois Intermediate Football Championship medals and in 2006 he was part of the team that reached the Laois Senior Football Championship final where they were beaten by Ballyroan Gaels.

McDonald was a pupil of Presentation College, Askea, Carlow from 1992 to 1997 & was a member of the school Gaelic football teams.

References
Laois Nationalist - 2003 All-Ireland Quarter Final report

Year of birth missing (living people)
Living people
Arles-Killeen Gaelic footballers
Laois inter-county Gaelic footballers